Waks or WAKS may refer to:

People
Aesha Waks, American actress
Leonard J. Waks (born 1942), American philosopher 
Manny Waks (born 1976), Australian activist
Mosze Waks (Michał Waszyński, 1904–1965), Polish film director and producer
Nathan Waks (born 1951), Australian cellist, composer

Radiostations
WAKS, a radio station (96.5 FM) licensed to Akron, Ohio, United States, which has carried the WAKS callsign since 2001
WCPN, a radio station (104.9 FM) licensed to Lorain, Ohio, United States, which carried the WAKS callsign from 1999 to 2001
WKDD, a radio station (98.1 FM) currently licensed to Munroe Falls, Ohio, United States, which briefly carried the WAKS callsign while licensed to Canton, Ohio, United States in 2001
WXKB, a radio station (103.9 FM) licensed to Cape Coral, Florida, United States, which carried the WAKS callsign from 1990 to 1993
WMTX, a radio station (100.7 FM) licensed to Tampa, Florida, United States, which carried the WAKS callsign from 1998 to 1999

Other
Wäks, a European punk rock group

See also

Wak (disambiguation)
Wachs
Wax (disambiguation)

Polish-language surnames
Yiddish-language surnames